The 2001 Delaware Fightin' Blue Hens football team represented the University of Delaware as a member of the Atlantic 10 Conference (A-10) during the 2001 NCAA Division I-AA football season. Led by Tubby Raymond in his 36th and final season as head coach, the Fightin' Blue Hens compiled an overall record of 4–6 with a mark of 4–5 in conference play, tying for sixth place in the A-10. The team played home games at Delaware Stadium in Newark, Delaware.

The game scheduled against  on September 15 was cancelled after the September 11 attacks. Raymond retired following the season, ending his career with 300 wins, and was succeeded by K. C. Keeler.

Schedule

References

Delaware
Delaware Fightin' Blue Hens football seasons
Delaware Fightin' Blue Hens football